Weekender may refer to:

 "Weekender", Australian term for weekend house, an accommodation used for holiday vacations

Boats
Pearson 26 Weekender, an American sailboat design for weekend cruising.
Typhoon 18 Weekender, an American sailboat design for weekend cruising.
Weekender 24, an American sailboat design for weekend cruising.

Film and television
 Weekender (film), a 2011 British drama
 The Weekenders, an American animated television series
 The Weekenders (TV pilot), a one-off British television pilot

Music
 Weekender (album), released in 2002 by German duo Aquagen
 "Weekender" (Flowered Up song), a 1992 single
 Weekender (Hey! Say! JUMP song), a 2014 single
 Weekender Records, an English independent record label, 2006–2010

Publishing
 Weekender (Devon newspaper), a free newspaper in Devon, United Kingdom
 Weekender (Northeastern Pennsylvania weekly), an arts and entertainment weekly for Wilkes-Barre

See also